Sunset, Texas may refer to the following places in the U.S. state of Texas:
Sunset, Montague County, Texas
Sunset, Starr County, Texas